Balkassar is a village and union council, an administrative subdivision, of Chakwal District in the Punjab Province of Pakistan. Part of Chakwal Tehsil, the village attains its name from the Kassar tribe, who also make up most of the population. It is one of a cluster of villages such as Chawli, Dhudial, Mangwal, Bikhari Khurd and Balokassar, which form the tribal homeland of the Kassar tribe.

References

Union councils of Chakwal District
Populated places in Chakwal District